Monilea simulans is a species of sea snail, a marine gastropod mollusk in the family Trochidae, the top snails.

Description
This species differs from the type species (Monilea callifera) in having only faint indications of the nodose plications at the upper angle of the whorls. It also differs in color, being paler and less rosy.

Distribution
This marine species occurs off the Maldives, the Laccadives in the South China Sea and off Japan.

References

 Hedley, C. (1916). A preliminary index of the Mollusca of Western Australia. Journal and Proceedings of the Royal Society of Western Australia. 1 : 3-77
 Yen, T.-C., 1942. A review of the Chinese gastropods in the British Museum. Proc. Malac. Soc. Lond., 24(5/6):170-290.
 Higo, S., Callomon, P. & Goto, Y. (1999) Catalogue and Bibliography of the Marine Shell-Bearing Mollusca of Japan. Elle Scientific Publications, Yao, Japan, 749 pp

External links
 To World Register of Marine Species

simulans
Gastropods described in 1899